Theodor Hertzka, or Hertzka Tivadar (July 13, 1845, Budapest – October 22, 1924, Wiesbaden) was a Jewish-Hungarian-Austrian economist and journalist.

Life
He studied at the universities of Vienna and Budapest, and in 1872 became a member of the editorial staff of the Neue Freie Presse of Vienna. In 1879 he founded the newspaper Wiener Allgemeine Zeitung, which he edited until 1886. He was a friend of Johannes Brahms.

Hertzka has been called the "Austrian Bellamy", because his novel Freiland, ein soziales Zukunftsbild had a similar theme to that of Edward Bellamy's novel Looking Backward.

Though Hertzka was not a Zionist and his utopian vision was directed at human beings in general, Theodor Herzl acknowledged the influence of Hertzka on his own ideas in the opening chapter of his book Der Judenstaat, envisioning the creation of a Jewish state.

Bibliography
Other works by Hertzka are:
 Die Mängel des österreichischen Aktiengesetzentwurfs, Vienna, 1875;
 Das Wesen des Geldes, Leipzig, 1887(in which he recommended the introduction of the gold standard in Austria);
 Die Gesetze der Handelspolitik, ib. 1880;
 Das Personenporto: Ein Vorschlag zur Durchführung eines billigen Einheitstarifs im Personenverkehr der Eisenbahnen, Vienna, 1885;
 Die Gesetze der sozialen Entwickelung, Leipzig, 1886;
 Freiland – ein soziales Zukunftsbild Leipzig, 1890;
 Wechselkurs und Agio, Vienna, 1894

References

Further reading
 Ransom, Arthur (1891). "A Competitive Utopia," The Gentleman's Magazine, Vol. CCLXXI, pp. 44–49.

External links
 Ulrich E Bach, “Seeking Emptiness: Theodor Hertzka’s Colonial Utopia Freiland (1890)”  In: Utopian Studies 22.1 (2011): 74-90.
 
 

1845 births
1924 deaths
Freiwirtschaft
Austrian journalists

Hungarian journalists
Hungarian Jews